

Světozor ("Seeing the World") was a Czech-language illustrated magazine published in 19th and 20th century.

History and profile
Světozor was created by Pavel Josef Šafařík in 1834. Šafařík was inspired by the British penny press and the German Pfennig-Magazin. The newspaper, trying to entertain the readers with curiosities, did not incite much interest and closed down in two years.

In 1867 the magazine was reestablished by František Skrejšovský (1837–1902), an entrepreneur and politician. A substantial portion of the weekly was dedicated to the literature and the arts. Since 1899 for more than 30 years the magazine was owned by the publishing house of Jan Otto. Between 1933–1939 the magazine was owned by leftist journalist and photographer Pavel Altschul (1900–1944).

Other notable uses
Světozor is also the name of a large (700 seats) cinema built in 1918 in Prague. There seems to be no relation with the magazine. The building serves as a cinema and an arthouse until today: website, history.

Literature
 Jaromír Čejka: Pavel Altschul a Světozor v letech 1933–39 (Pavel Altschul and Světozor during 1933-39). Diploma work at the Academy of Performing Arts in Prague, 1983, .

External links 

 Scanned issues of Světozor (until 1899)
 WorldCat record

Literary magazines published in the Czech Republic
Czech-language magazines
Defunct magazines published in Czechoslovakia
Defunct literary magazines published in Europe
Magazines established in 1834
Magazines with year of disestablishment missing
Visual arts magazines
Weekly magazines